John Charles Bisby (4 December 1876 – 1945) was an English professional footballer who played as a wing half.

References

1876 births
1945 deaths
People from Rawmarsh
English footballers
Association football wing halves
Kilnhurst Colliery F.C. players
Sheffield United F.C. players
Grimsby Town F.C. players
Denaby United F.C. players
English Football League players